Yao Zhenhua (born 1969/1970) is a Chinese billionaire businessman, and the chairman of Baoneng Group.

Career
In 1992, Yao founded Baoneng Group, which now has over 40 shopping malls in China.

In February 2017, Yao was banned from China's insurance industry for ten years after a failed takeover bid for Vanke by a Baoneng company, Foresea Life Insurance.

Personal life
Yao lives in Shenzhen, China.

References

Living people
Billionaires from Guangdong
Businesspeople from Guangdong
Year of birth missing (living people)